Lukas Nottbeck (born October 22, 1988) is a German footballer who plays for 1. FC Köln II.

External links

1988 births
Living people
German footballers
1. FC Köln II players
Borussia Dortmund II players
TuS Koblenz players
SC Fortuna Köln players
FC Viktoria Köln players
People from Datteln
Sportspeople from Münster (region)
3. Liga players
Regionalliga players
Association football midfielders
Footballers from North Rhine-Westphalia